Nazar Nurzaidin (born in Pemalang, Indonesia, 1 January 1995) is an Indonesian professional footballer who plays as a full-back for Liga 1 club Barito Putera.

Club career

Barito Putera
Was born in Pemalang, Nazar started his professional career with Barito Putera in 2015.

International career 
He called up for the Indonesia on 21 March 2017 against Myanmar in the friendly.

Career statistics

Club

References

External links 
 
 Nazar Nurzaidin at Liga Indonesia

Indonesian footballers
1995 births
Living people
PS Barito Putera players
Liga 1 (Indonesia) players
People from Pemalang Regency
Association football defenders
Sportspeople from Central Java